Kędzierzyn may refer to the following places:
Kędzierzyn, Greater Poland Voivodeship (west-central Poland)
Kędzierzyn, Masovian Voivodeship (east-central Poland)
Kędzierzyn, West Pomeranian Voivodeship (north-west Poland)
Kędzierzyn-Koźle, the capital city of Kędzierzyn-Koźle County, Silesia, Poland